Camere da letto (Bedrooms) is a 1997 Italian romantic comedy film written, directed and starred by Simona Izzo.

Plot

Cast 
 Diego Abatantuono as Dario
 Maria Grazia Cucinotta as  Maddalena
 Giobbe Covatta as  Sandro
 Ricky Tognazzi as  Fabrizio
 Simona Izzo as  Margherita
 Francesco Venditti as  Lorenzo 
 Chiara Salerno as Anna
 Giuppy Izzo as  Tatiana
 Isa Bellini as Grandma
 Alexandra La Capria as  Luisa

Reception
The film opened on 74 screens and grossed $390,864 in its opening weekend, being the fifth highest-grossing film in Italy for the weekend.

See also  
 List of Italian films of 1997

References

External links

Camere da letto at Variety Distribution

1997 films
1997 romantic comedy films
Italian romantic comedy films
Films directed by Simona Izzo
Films scored by Nicola Piovani
1990s Italian-language films
1990s Italian films